The Colombian Association of Practical Shooting, Spanish Asociación Colombiana de Tiro Practico, is the Colombian association for practical shooting under the International Practical Shooting Confederation.

References 

Regions of the International Practical Shooting Confederation
Sports organisations of Colombia